KWNA (1400 AM) was the call sign assigned from 1954 until 2019, and the last call sign used on the air, for radio station KWXA in Winnemucca, Nevada, United States. The station, while silent, was assigned the call letters KWXA by the Federal Communications Commission on March 16, 2019. However, its license was deleted on March 5, 2021, before making any broadcasts under the KWXA call letters.

The station had a classic rock format, and was last owned by Isaac Diaz through licensee Fundacion Manitas Llenas, Inc., and featured programming from ABC Radio.

Programming
Programming was supplied by Westwood One.

Translator
In addition to the main signal, the station broadcast via a translator on the FM dial, licensed to Winnemucca. K221AG broadcast on 92.1 FM. The licenses for both KWXA and K221AG were cancelled on March 5, 2021, as the station had been off the air for over one year.

References

External links
FCC Station Search Details: DKWXA (Facility ID: 60046)
FCC History Cards for KWXA  (covering 1954-1981 as KWNA)

WXA
Winnemucca, Nevada
Radio stations disestablished in 2021
Radio stations established in 1955
Defunct radio stations in the United States
WXA
1955 establishments in Nevada
2021 disestablishments in Nevada